Plagne may refer to:
 Plagne, Ain, a French commune in the Ain department
 Plagne, Haute-Garonne, a French commune in the Haute-Garonne department
 La Plagne, a French ski resort
 Plagne, Switzerland, a village in the Canton of Bern